Alemann is a German surname. Notable people with the surname include:

Claudia von Alemann (born 1943), German film director
Ernesto Alemann (1893–1982), Argentine newspaper editor
Katja Alemann, Argentine actress and writer
Roberto Alemann (born 1922), Argentine lawyer, economist, publisher and academic

See also
Aleman (disambiguation)

German-language surnames